Dakshin Telikhali is a village in Bhandaria Upazila, which is in Pirojpur District of Barisal Division in southwestern Bangladesh.

References

Populated places in Pirojpur District